Marquette Park may refer to one of several places that are named in honor of Jacques Marquette, a French Jesuit missionary.
Marquette Park (Chicago) in Chicago, Illinois
Marquette Park (Gary) in Gary, Indiana
Marquette Park (Mackinac Island) on Mackinac Island, Michigan
Marquette Park (St. Louis), a historic park in the Dutchtown neighborhood of St. l
Louis with a recreation center and pool